The Three Links Cattle Company was a cattle ranching company in Walnut Grove, Arizona.  By the 1950s, it was one of the largest cattle ranches in Arizona.  It was sold to Rex Ellsworth and his brother, Reed in 1959.

References

Ranches in Arizona
Buildings and structures in Santa Cruz County, Arizona